Elbek Tazhyieu (born January 7, 1986) (also known as Elbek Tojiev) is a male Greco-Roman wrestler from Belarus. He represented Uzbekistan from 2003 to 2007, but represented Belarus at the 2012 Summer Olympics in the men's -55 kg division, where he lost in the second round to Japanese wrestler Kohei Hasegawa.

References

External links
 bio on fila-wrestling.com

Living people
1986 births
Belarusian male sport wrestlers
Uzbekistani male sport wrestlers
Wrestlers at the 2012 Summer Olympics
Olympic wrestlers of Belarus
Wrestlers at the 2006 Asian Games
World Wrestling Championships medalists
Asian Games competitors for Uzbekistan